The French Island National Park is a national park located in the Greater Melbourne region of Victoria, Australia.

Features
The park comprises a diverse range of habitats including mangrove salt marshes and open woodland.

The adjacent  French Island Marine National Park complements the French Island National Park by protecting extensive sea grass beds, mangroves and mud flats that provide habitat for fish, waterbirds and invertebrates.

See also

 Protected areas of Victoria
 List of national parks of Australia

References

National parks of Victoria (Australia)
Protected areas established in 1998
1998 establishments in Australia
Western Port